Raj Kumari Dhillon is an Indian politician from the Aam Aadmi Party. She was elected as an MLA from Hari Nagar constituency in 2020 at 7th Delhi Legislative Assembly elections defeating BJP candidate Tajinder Pal Singh Bagga. Prior to this, she was a ward councillor from Congress Party.

Electoral performance

References 

Living people
Year of birth missing (living people)
Delhi MLAs 2020–2025
Women members of the Delhi Legislative Assembly
21st-century Indian women politicians